Emily E. Gallagher (born March 23, 1984) is an American politician. She is the Democratic representative serving District 50 in the New York State Assembly, which comprises parts of Greenpoint, Williamsburg and Fort Greene, among other neighborhoods located in the northern portion of the New York City borough of Brooklyn.

Early life

Gallagher grew up in Rochester, New York, and moved to Greenpoint, Brooklyn shortly after graduating from Ithaca College in 2006.

Politics
In 2016, Gallagher ran for female Democratic leader of New York's 50th State Assembly district against 32-year incumbent Linda Minucci. She was endorsed by Congresswoman Nydia Velázquez and New York City Council Member Antonio Reynoso, but ultimately lost with 44.9% of the vote.

Gallagher was soon after appointed to Brooklyn Community Board 1, where she worked on transportation issues, the environment, and uncovering community board abuses.

New York State Assembly
On September 23, 2019, Gallagher launched a campaign against incumbent Joe Lentol for the Democratic primary to represent District 50 in the New York State Assembly. Gallagher ran on a platform of environmental sustainability, housing justice, and transit improvement, and received endorsements from New Kings Democrats, New York Communities for Change and the Brooklyn Young Democrats. A member of the Brooklyn Democratic Socialists of America, she sought their endorsement but did not receive it due to Brooklyn DSA's limited capacity and desire to focus on building power in working-class communities of color.

On primary election night, June 23, 2020, Gallagher trailed Lentol by 1,763 votes based on in-person totals. Absentee ballots were more significant than usual, however, due to the COVID-19 pandemic, and once they were counted, Gallagher was determined to have won by between 400-600 votes.

References

Ithaca College alumni
Democratic Socialists of America politicians from New York
Democratic Party members of the New York State Assembly
Women state legislators in New York (state)
Living people
Politicians from Brooklyn
21st-century American politicians
21st-century American women politicians
1984 births